The Cape Ann Transportation Authority (CATA) is a public, non-profit organization in Massachusetts, charged with providing public transportation to the Cape Ann area, consisting of the city of Gloucester and the nearby towns of Essex, Ipswich and Rockport.

Routes

The system operates the following routes:

The Green Line serves all of Downtown Gloucester every half an hour.
The Red Line serves the area between Gloucester and Rockport via Thatcher Road.
The Blue Line serves the area between Gloucester and Rockport via Lanesville.
The Orange Line serves the area between Gloucester and Magnolia.
The Purple Line serves the area between Gloucester and West Gloucester.
The Yellow Line serves the area between Gloucester and the Blackburn Industrial Park.
The Shopping Mall Express is a shuttle between Gloucester, Liberty Tree Mall and Northshore Mall.
The Ipswich - Essex - Crane Beach is a summertime weekend shuttle service connecting Ipswich MBTA train station, Crane Beach, and Essex

Fleet
CATA operates a diverse set of vehicles on its routes. Its full-size bus fleet includes 6 International HCCB buses, 6 Gillig Low Floor buses, and 2 Ford ElDorado buses, while its mini bus fleet is made up of 21 Ford E-Series vehicles, including 12 Ford Cutaways, 5 Ford E350s, and 4 Ford E450s. CATA also utilizes 2 American Heritage Trolley tourist trolleys.

References

External links
Cape Ann Transportation Authority

Bus transportation in Massachusetts
Transportation in Essex County, Massachusetts
Gloucester, Massachusetts
Rockport, Massachusetts